Montezuma is a town in Puntarenas Province, Costa Rica which began as a remote fishing village and has gained popularity since the 1980s among tourists on a budget.

Most services are in Cóbano. The nearest airport is located in Tambor.

The town features a mix of residents and foreign backpackers and eco-tourists who come for the beaches, rivers, and scenic waterfalls surrounding the village. The nearby Cabo Blanco Nature Reserve draws a large number of visitors to the area.

Further reading

 Lonely Planet Costa Rica 
 B&B Map Costa Rica Road Map 
 "the Montezuma map and guide"—available free from the downtown Tropisphere Real Estate Montezuma centro office

References

Populated places in Puntarenas Province